Capo Ferro Lighthouse is an active lighthouse located on the same name promontory which marks the southern entrance to the Strait of Bonifacio and to the Maddalena archipelago, in the municipality of Arzachena, in the north east of Sardinia, Italy, on the Tyrrhenian Sea.

Description
The lighthouse is completely automated and  operated by the Marina Militare with the identification code number 1146 E.F.

See also
 List of lighthouses in Italy
 Arzachena

References

External links

 Servizio Fari Marina Militare

Lighthouses in Italy
Buildings and structures in Sardinia